The 2008 Louisiana–Monroe Warhawks football team represented the University of Louisiana at Monroe in the 2008 NCAA Division I FBS football season. Louisiana–Monroe competed as a member of the Sun Belt Conference, and played their home games at Malone Stadium. The Warhawks were led by sixth-year head coach Charlie Weatherbie. ULM finished the season with a 4–8 record (3–4).

The Warhawks' season started with a fumble on the first play, which 10th-ranked Auburn returned for a touchdown. The Tigers eventually won that game, 34–0. The following week at Arkansas, ULM led in both the third quarter, 24–6, and fourth quarter, 27–14, but eventually lost, 28–27, after missing a 45-yard field goal attempt. Against Louisiana-Lafayette, ULM surrendered a school record of 728 yards. ULM had led Florida Atlantic, 21–10, at half time, but ultimately lost, 29–28, when the Owls scored on a 22-yard touchdown pass with 0:20 remaining to play. The next week, however, ULM upset eventual Sun Belt champions Troy, 31–30. The Warhawks were shut out by Ole Miss, 59–0, but won their season finale against Florida International, 31–27. ULM finished the season tied for fifth (second-to-last) in the Sun Belt Conference.

Schedule

References

Louisiana–Monroe
Louisiana–Monroe Warhawks football seasons
Louisiana–Monroe Warhawks football